The fourth government of Felipe González was formed on 14 July 1993, following the latter's election as Prime Minister of Spain by the Congress of Deputies on 9 July and his swearing-in on 13 July, as a result of the Spanish Socialist Workers' Party (PSOE) emerging as the largest parliamentary force at the 1993 Spanish general election.

González's fourth cabinet was an important change compared to the previous one: only five members remained in their previous ministries, four changed of portfolio and eight were new. It was described as the least political cabinet out of the four González governments, with up to six independent figures, as well as the one with the most female ministers (Carmen Alborch, Ángeles Amador and Cristina Alberdi). The sole deputy prime minister's office under Narcís Serra from the Socialists' Party of Catalonia (PSC) was maintained with increased competences on economic affairs.

The parliamentary defeat of the 1996 General State Budget bill on 25 October 1995 led to the virtual downfall of González's government, which was forced to prorogue the 1995 budget and ultimately decided to dissolve parliament and call a snap election. It was automatically dismissed on 4 March 1996 as a consequence of the 1996 general election, but remained in acting capacity until the next government was sworn in.

Investiture

Cabinet changes
González's fourth government saw a number of cabinet changes during its tenure:
On 18 November 1993, Minister of the Interior José Luis Corcuera announced his intention to submit his resignation after the Constitutional Court of Spain declared the unconstitutionality of a number of provisions within the 1992 Organic Law on Protection of Citizen Security, colloquially known as the "Corcuera Law" or the "Law of kick down the door", that allowed police forces, without previous judicial authorization, to enter private properties based on the mere suspicion that a crime was being committed within. Corcuera's resignation was accepted on 24 November, and the following day Antoni Asunción was appointed to replace him at the helm of the interior ministry.
On 6 May 1994, Juan Alberto Belloch and Luis María Atienza were assigned the responsibilities  of the Interior and Agriculture, Fisheries and Food ministries after the resignations of Antoni Asunción and Vicente Albero. Asunción announced on 30 April his intention to step down from his post after it transpired that former Director-General of the Civil Guard Luis Roldán, suspected of amassing a fortune through fraudulent means during his years of service and whose monitoring was responsibility of the Interior ministry, had fled Spain to escape legal prosecution. Concurrently, Albero resigned as agriculture minister on 4 May after he became involved in a tax fraud scandal. Prime Minister González accepted both ministers' resignations on 4 May 1994. As a result of the reshuffle, the Justice and Interior departments were merged into a single ministry.
On 12 June 1995, a major scandal unveiled after it transpired that the Superior Center of Defense Information (CESID), the main Spanish intelligence agency at the time, had been recording and keeping the taped telephone conversations of dozens of prominent public figures for years, including politicians, businessmen, journalists or the King himself, apparently without the cabinet's knowledge. The scandal brought about the resignations of Julián García Vargas, Minister of Defence since 1991 and under whose authority the CESID was responsible to, but also of Deputy Prime Minister Narcís Serra, who had been the defence minister in the 1982 to 1991 period. Prime Minister González accepted the resignations on 28 June 1995, but despite earlier speculation on a larger reshuffle, the government changes were limited to replacing García Vargas by Minister of Education Gustavo Suárez Pertierra and the incorporation of former President of the Valencian Government Joan Lerma into the cabinet in the Public Administrations portfolio, replacing Jerónimo Saavedra who, in turn, filled Suárez Pertierra's vacancy in Education; no replacement for Narcís Serra as deputy prime minister was appointed.
On 19 December 1995, Javier Solana was replaced by Carlos Westendorp in the Foreign Affairs portfolio after the former was elected as new Secretary General of NATO.

Council of Ministers
The Council of Ministers was structured into the offices for the prime minister, the deputy prime minister, 16 ministries and the post of the spokesperson of the Government. The number of ministries was reduced to 15 after the ministries of Justice and Interior were merged in 1994. The office of the deputy prime minister was left vacant from 1995.

Departmental structure
Felipe González's fourth government was organised into several superior and governing units, whose number, powers and hierarchical structure varied depending on the ministerial department.

Unit/body rank
() Secretary of state
() Undersecretary
() Director-general
() Autonomous agency
() Military & intelligence agency

Notes

References

External links
Governments. Juan Carlos I (20.11.1975 ...). CCHS-CSIC (in Spanish).
Governments of Spain 1982–1996. Ministers of Felipe González. Historia Electoral.com (in Spanish).
The governments of the first period of the Spanish Socialist Workers' Party (1982–1996). Lluís Belenes i Rodríguez History Page (in Spanish).

1993 establishments in Spain
1996 disestablishments in Spain
Cabinets established in 1993
Cabinets disestablished in 1996
Council of Ministers (Spain)